This is a list of the National Register of Historic Places listings in Redwood National and State Parks.

This is intended to be a complete list of the properties and districts on the National Register of Historic Places in Redwood National and State Parks, California, United States.  The locations of National Register properties and districts for which the latitude and longitude coordinates are included below, may be seen in a map.

There are eight properties and districts listed on the National Register in the parks.

Current listings 

|}

See also 
National Register of Historic Places listings in Del Norte County, California
National Register of Historic Places listings in Humboldt County, California
National Register of Historic Places listings in California

References 

Redwood National and State Parks